Vlčkovice v Podkrkonoší is a municipality and village in Trutnov District in the Hradec Králové Region of the Czech Republic. It has about 400 inhabitants.

Administrative parts
The municipality is made up of village parts of Dolní Vlčkovice and Horní Vlčkovice.

History
The first written mention of Vlčkovice is from 1415.

References

External links

Villages in Trutnov District